Tehama is a Canadian  Software as a Service (SaaS) company headquartered in Ottawa, Ontario, that provides a virtual, cloud-based, Desktop-as-a-Service (DaaS) platform for the secure exchange of work over the internet, allowing organizations to securely manage remote workers, third-party vendors, and freelancers, and integrate them into their working environments.

History 

Tehama began as a suite of virtual desktop, zero-trust network access, auditable secret and file sharing and workflow-automation technologies enabling secure, remote Internet-based work amongst the global workforce and clientele of Pythian, an IT services company founded in 1997. In September 2018, to offer the Tehama platform to the public, CEO and entrepreneur Paul Vallée launched Tehama as a subsidiary business unit of Pythian.

In September 2019, in response to a surge in demand for the Tehama platform, the Tehama unit was spun-off as a company in its own right, independent of Pythian. Financing for this venture was provided by New York-based private equity firm Mill Point Capital, who thereby gained a majority stake in Pythian. Vallée left his position at Pythian to become Tehama's CEO.

As one of Tehama's core services facilitates remote work, the company saw a notable upswing in interest in March 2020 during the COVID-19 crisis, with a 35-fold increase in inquiries from the prior month. By May 2020, having seen its client base grow to more than 150, Tehama announced that it had raised US$10,000,000 through Series A funding round led by OMERS Ventures.

In July 2020, Tehama conducted the Digital by Default Summit, an online virtual conference on the subject of remote work, with particular focus on its greater adoption in the wake of the COVID-19 crisis. The event occurred again in 2021 and featured a closing fireside chat with remote work expert Kate Lister.

See also 

 Remote work
 Software as a Service
 Platform as a Service
 Desktop as a Service

References

External links 

 
 Digital By Default Summit

Companies based in Ottawa

International information technology consulting firms

Outsourcing companies

Canadian brands
Internet properties established in 2019
ICT service providers
Remote desktop